Piliscus is a genus of small sea snails with transparent internal shells, marine gastropod mollusks in the family Velutinidae. Because the shell is mostly internal, these snails resemble sea slugs in general appearance.

Species
Species within the genus Piliscus include:

Piliscus commodus (Middendorff, 1851)
Piliscus krebsii
Piliscus probus
Piliscus rostratus (Golikov & Gulbin, 1990)
Piliscus undulatus (Golikov & Gulbin, 1990)

References

Velutinidae

vi:Piliscus commodus